"Last Impression" is the 12th single by J-pop duo Two-Mix, released by King Records on July 23, 1998. Composed by the duo of Shiina Nagano and Minami Takayama, the song was used as the ending theme of the anime theatrical compilation Gundam Wing: Endless Waltz Special Edition. It was also the duo's final single under King Records.

The single peaked at No. 8 on Oricon's weekly singles chart and sold over 107,000 copies.

Track listing
All lyrics are written by Shiina Nagano. All music is arranged by Two-Mix.

Chart position

Other versions 
The duo recorded an orchestral mix with Masamichi Amano and Warsaw National Philharmonic Orchestra on the 1998 self-cover album Baroque Best.

Cover versions 
 Chihiro Yonekura covered the song on the 2022 various artists album Two-Mix Tribute Album "Crysta-Rhythm".

References

External links 
 
 

1998 singles
1998 songs
Two-Mix songs
Gundam songs
Mobile Suit Gundam Wing
Japanese-language songs
King Records (Japan) singles
Songs written by Minami Takayama